The following is a timeline of the history of the city of Camagüey, Cuba.

Prior to 20th century

 1528 - Santa María del Puerto Príncipe established by settlers relocating from  Caonao, and previously from Punta del Guincho.
 1599 - Convento de San Francisco founded.
 1616 - Fire.
 1617 - Cathedral first built.
 1668 - City raided by Welsh pirate Henry Morgan.
 1720 - San Francisco de Paula monastery rebuilt.
 1723 - Santo Cristo del Buen Viaje church built.
 1728 - Hospital de Caridad de San Juan de Dios established.
 1730 - Hospital de Nuestra Senora del Carmen founded.
 1733 - City Hall construction begins.
 1737 - San Lázaro hospital built.
 1741 - Epidemic outbreak.
 1779 - Iglesia de Nuestra Señora de la Soledad (church) built.
 1800 - Royal Audiencia of Santo Domingo (Spanish colonial supreme court) relocated to Puerto Principe from Santo Domingo.
 1814 - Future poet Gertrudis Gómez de Avellaneda born in Puerto Principe.
 1817 - Town becomes a city.
 1842 - Filarmónica (music society) founded.
 1850 - El Principal theatre opens.
 1851 - Puerto Principe and Nuevitas Railroad begins operating.
 1864
 Benemérita Popular Santa Cecilia (music society) formed.
 Our Lady of Candelaria Cathedral rebuilt.
 1872 - Casino Español (music society) formed.
 1874 - March: Battle of Las Guasimas (1874) fought; Cuban rebels win.
 1886 - El Arrebol newspaper begins publication.
 1898  - 
 Lope Recio Loynaz leading the third cavalry regiment makes a triumphal entry in the city, marking the end of the Cuban War of Independence for Camagūey, 
 Pedro Mendoza Guerra becomes governor of province.
 1899
 El Eco Mercantil newspaper begins publication.
 Population: 25,102 city; 53,140 district; 88,234 province.

20th century

1900s–1940s
 1902 - El Camagüeyano newspaper begins publication.
 1903
 Porto Principe renamed "Camagüey."
 City becomes seat of Camagüey Province.
 1907 - Population: 29,616 city; 66,460 municipality; 118,269 province.
 1912
 Roman Catholic diocese of Camagüey established.
 Ignacio Agramonte monument erected in Agramonte Park.
 1913
 Teatro Avellaneda opens.
 Camagüey Jazz Band formed.
 1919
 Banda Municipal de Música formed.
 Population: 98,193.
 1932 - Hurricane.
 1935 - Hurricane.
 1938 - Biblioteca Municipal (library) established.
 1948 - Cine Casablanca opens.

1950s–1990s
 1956 - El Cubano Libre student newspaper begins publication.
 1959 - Huber Matos becomes governor of province.
 1961 - Coro de Camagüey (musical group) formed.
 1963 - Biblioteca provincial de Camagüey Julio Antonio Mella (library) established.
 1964 - Population: 153,100.
 1965 - Estadio Cándido González (stadium) built.
 1966 - Population: 171,000.
 1967
  established.
 Ballet de Camagüey founded.
 1968 - Archivo Histórico provincial de Camagüey (archives) established.
 1970 - Population: 197,720.
 1976
 Instituto Superior Pedagógico established.
 Museo Estudiantil "Jesús Suárez Gayol" opens.
 1981 - Instituto Superior de Ciencias Médicas de Camagüey established.
 1983 - Festival de Teatro de Camagüey (theatre festival) begins.
 1988 - Sister city relationship established with Madison, Wisconsin, USA.
 1994 - Creole Choir of Cuba established.
 1998
 January: Catholic pope visits Camagüey.
 Office of City Historian established.
 1999 - Population: 306,049 city; 785,800 province.

21st century
 2008
 September: Hurricane Ike occurs.
 Old town designated an UNESCO World Heritage Site.
 Museo de San Juan de Dios (museum) opens.
 2014 - Population: 304,027.

See also
 Camagüey history
 Timelines of other cities in Cuba: Cienfuegos, Guantánamo, Havana, Holguín, Matanzas, Santiago de Cuba

References

Bibliography

in English
 
 
 
  (Includes profile of Camagüey)

in Spanish
 
 
 
 
 
 
 
 
 
 
 
 
 
 
 
 
 . 2001-
  (chronology)
 
  (fulltext)

External links

 
 
 Items related to Camagüey, various dates (via Europeana)
 Items related to Camagüey, various dates (via Digital Public Library of America)

Camagüey
Camaguey
Cuba-related lists
Years in Cuba
camaguey